Queer nationalism is a phenomenon related both to the gay and lesbian liberation movement and nationalism. Adherents of this movement support the notion that the LGBT community forms a distinct people due to their unique culture and customs.

Queer Nation 

The homophobic aspect of many cultures has led to increasing frustration and a wish to separate from a perceived hostile heterosexual majority. These feelings found their expression in 1990 with the establishment of Queer Nation, a radical organization best known for its slogan "We're here. We're queer. Get used to it". 

In 1969, gay activist Don Jackson from California proposed to take over Alpine County, California—a project also known as Stonewall Nation.

The first attempt to make territorial claims was made in 2004 by a group of Australian gay activists who declared the tiny islands of Cato Reef to be the Gay and Lesbian Kingdom of the Coral Sea Islands and Dale Parker Anderson to be the Emperor. Following the 2005 disagreements within the group, the Gay and Lesbian Commonwealth Kingdom and Unified Gay Tribe have cancelled their affiliation to Anderson. Some other groups with similar causes exist, e.g. the Gay Homeland Foundation and a micronation called Gay Parallel Republic.

In 2007, Garrett Graham published a plan and constitution for a gay state, connected to Theodor Herzl's Jewish state ("Herzl's words, messages and concepts live on in ... The Gay State").

The Pink Panthers Movement 
The gay rights activist group the Pink Panthers Movement (PPM) in Denver, Colorado, as well as their charters/chapters throughout the United States, including a large group located in Fresno, California, have identified themselves not only as radical and militant but also as queer nationalists. These formed several small parties throughout the United States and Canada that stand in solidarity only to those that identify as supporters of the old Queer Nation.

Research on queer nationalism 
An advanced analysis was published 1996 by Brian Walker. In his article "Social Movements as Nationalisms, or, On the Very Idea of a Queer Nation", Walker points out that several features of the nationalistic creation of cultural identity apply to the LGBT national movement as well. Walker classifies queer nationalism as one of the new cultural forms of nationalism which are distinct from the old ethnic and religious types of nationalism and concludes that the gay and lesbian community fulfils many criteria to be regarded as a people for the following reasons:
 All forms of nationalism began as social movements, which queer nationalism is—a group of people set apart from those around them by in-group attitudes and discrimination from others.
 The gay community has a culture, with distinct discussion groups, book stores, magazines, bars, cabarets and other such features.
 It possesses a shared history and literature.

Walker regards modern communication technologies such as the Internet as offering a chance for the LGBT community to further integrate as a non-territorial nation.

This thesis is supported by Paul Treanor, who considers an alternative (non-nationalist) world order possible. In this context, Treanor mentions the LGBT community as a "non-territorial nationalist movement".

Will Kymlicka acknowledges that LGBT people have developed a group identity and group culture similar to those of ethnocultural groups, but he argues in favor of integration instead of separatism.

See also 
 Gay village
 Homonationalism
 Identity politics
 Lesbian separatism
 Political lesbianism

References

Further reading 
 Paola Bacchetta (2013). "Queer Formations in (Hindu) Nationalism". In Sexuality Studies. Edited by Sanjay Srivasta. pp. 121–140. Oxford, United Kingdom: Oxford University Press.
 Puar, J. K. (2018). Terrorist Assemblages : Homonationalism in Queer Times. Duke University Press.

External links 
 Rethinking Nationalism
 Summary on Brian Walker's theses
 Gay Homeland Foundation

LGBT rights
Independence movements
Nationalism and gender
Queer culture
fr:Homonationalisme